Urophora bakhtiari is a species of tephritid or fruit flies in the genus Urophora of the family Tephritidae.

Host Plant
Flowerheads of Cousinia archibaldii

References

Urophora
Insects described in 2015
Diptera of Asia